Barrister Bisi Adegbuyi  (born 11 May 1961) is a Nigerian lawyer, public administrator, former Nigeria Postmaster General, and CEO of Nigerian Postal Service (NIPOST). In 2014, he represented Ogun state at the National Confab and he is the founder of Grassroots Addressing and Identity Network (GAIN). Adegbuyi succeeded Dr. Richard Balami as the Postmaster General of Nigerian Postal Service in August 2016 by the administration of President Muhammadu Buhari and was removed in December 2019.

References

External links 



1961 births
Living people
People from Ogun State
University of Lagos alumni
20th-century Nigerian lawyers
Place of birth missing (living people)